The Opel Commodore is an executive car (E-segment) produced by Opel from 1967 to 1982. It is the six-cylinder variant of the Rekord with styling differences. The Commodore nameplate was used by Opel from 1967 to 1982. However, its nameplate/lineage continued until 2020 with the Australian Holden Commodore. The last generation was sold in the United Kingdom primarily as the Vauxhall Viceroy although Opel models were also sold.

Commodore A (1967–1971)

The Opel Commodore A was manufactured from 1967 to 1971, based on the Rekord C. After having offered a Rekord-6 powered by a 2.6 L 6-cylinder engine (which originated in the Opel Kapitän and Admiral) since March 1964, Opel in February 1967 launched the Commodore as a faster up-market version of the Rekord. The Commodore was initially available with the known 2.2-litre six or a larger 2.5 L engine developing  with a single carburettor. Body styles comprised a two-door or four-door notchback saloon and a two-door hardtop/fastback coupé. In September 1967 the sporty Commodore GS offering 130 hp (96 kW) from a dual-carburettor 2.5 L-six was introduced.

For the 1969 model year, the carryover 2.2-litre six was dropped and the optional 2-speed Powerglide automatic was abandoned in favor of Opel's new 3-speed automatic transmission.

The handbrake lever was moved from its position under the dash to a location between the front seats and the fuel tank was enlarged from 55 to 70 litres.

An even more sporty model than the GS, the Commodore GS/E, debuted in March 1970. The Commodore GS/E also had a career in motorsports, with a car prepared by Steinmetz. In April 1970 a Commodore with a detuned and carburetted 2.8 L-six giving  followed (GS 2800).

156,330 Commodore As were built, including 2,574 GS and GS/E variants.

The Commodore A "V body" platform was used by GM to produce other models in many markets, these include the Ranger sold in mainland Europe and also in South Africa together with the GM Opala which was built and sold in South America from 1968 through to 1992. The Opala has a very big following in South America. Their production commenced two years after the Commodore A debut in 1966.

Today the name Commodore is a name synonymous with GM Holden of Australia. However, that wasn't always the case. The first-generation Holden Commodore actually is equivalent to the third-generation Opel Commodore.

GS/E History

All engines for the Commodore were 12 valve, CIH straight-six engines ranging from 2.2 to 2.8 litres. All but one engine option had single-barrel (2.2) or double-barrel (2.5; 2.8) downdraught carburetor. in 1970 the GS/E model was introduced which as its badge implies didn't utilise carburetors. The "E" meaning Einspritzung or injection in English.

Opels didn't have the reputation for performance cars in the period and they had seen the positive impact on sales for other race winning manufacturers on having performance models in their range of cars. Opel wanted to be in this area of the market and the results of this desire was the Commodore GS/E.

The carburettors were ditched in favour of a Bosch D-Jetronic, Bosch's first commercially produced electronic fuel injection system. Bosch D-Jetronic was a very early version of multi-point EFI, the “D” stood for “drucksensorgesteuert” (pressure sensor regulated). Unlike later Bosch fuel injection system, the injection was direct to the cylinder instead of via the Plenum inlets, which meant the a specific cylinder head was manufactured specifically for the engine, making this model unique and expensive to produce and purchase. Different from older mechanical injection systems, it incorporated taking input from the pressure inside the intake manifold. This is known as the Air Mass Sensor or in modern terms this would be known as the MAP-sensor (manifold absolute pressure), a part that's commonly found in more modern vehicles.

Bosch sold the patent to Japanese companies that continue to produce injection systems based on D-Jetronic.

For comparison, the base model Porsche 911T in 1970 had  less, but was more expensive. The GS/E could accelerate from 0–100 km/h (62 mph) in 9.5 seconds, a similar value to the same period Porsche 911.

The GS/E Coupe model is known affectionately as the "German Charger".

Words from the official advert for the car from 1970:

150 bhp at your right foot ... power to kick you ahead. Acceleration that pushes you into the seats. Six cylinders that receive their fuel served electronically. An engine that doesn't let a single octane go to waste. GS/E: a lurking grumble in the two exhaust tubes.

Commodore B (1972–1977)

The Commodore B was based on the Rekord D, and launched in 1972. As in the previous generation, four models were offered: 2500 S, 2500 GS, 2800 GS and 2800 GS/E, as a four-door notchback saloon and two-door hardtop/notchback coupé (although the fastback design was replaced by a more conventional three-box design). Power of the 2.5-litre engine was  depending on the specifications (25S/25H), while carburetted 2.8-liters had . The fuel injected 2.8 used in the GS/E has .

The Rekord and Commodore were also assembled as CKD kits in Belgium and Switzerland in the 1970s. These cars carried the name Ranger and differed from the originals in having different grilles and trim. These cars were exported to various countries.

In 1974, due to new regulations regarding pollutant emissions, the 2.5 L base models were dropped and the 2.8 L was detuned to 129/140/155 PS (127/138/153 hp). Commodore B production ended in 1977.

The Commodore B series was like the A series briefly used in motorsports, and the extreme "Jumbo" Commodore raced in the 1974 "interserie". It used a 6.0-litre V8 engine and had large wings which almost made it unrecognizable as an Opel. It never enjoyed much success despite its massive powerplant and impressive output.

Foreign assembly
Opel Commodores were also built in Iran between 1974 and 1976 under the name Chevrolet Iran 2800 , 2500 , Royal and Custom with both 2.5 L and 2.8 L engines by Pars Khodro (General Motors Iran). The first Royale, also the first Chevrolet car built in Iran, left the production line on 15 January 1974. The Royale sold well initially, but the car had not been re-engineered for Iranian conditions and the low ground clearance coupled with carburettor troubles led to its reputation quickly being tarnished. The car was withdrawn by early 1977, replaced by the locally-built versions of the Buick Skylark, Chevrolet Nova, and Cadillac Seville (American origins).

It was also assembled in South Africa, where it was called the Chevrolet 2500, 3800, and 4100, and was a top seller in that market. These received inline-four or -six engines of Chevrolet origins, built locally.

Commodore C (1978–1982)

The Commodore C was first shown in late 1977, at the same time as the Rekord E. It only entered series production in October the following year, however. The South African version of this car, the Chevrolet Commodore, was actually ahead of the European original model to enter production, in September 1978. The Commodore continued to be a larger and more luxurious version of the Rekord. There was no coupé version of the Commodore C, as it was replaced by the Opel Monza, the coupé version of the Opel Senator, but a two-door notchback saloon was available until June 1981.

The Commodore C was never a success, occupying an uncomfortably narrow niche between the Rekord and Senator. Another concern was the fuel mileage, with a fuel injected Commodore taking considerably more fuel than the larger three-liter Senator. The outdated engine also had little torque available at lower engine speeds, and was noisy.

The new model featured a similar front end to the larger Senator. It was sold in the UK under the name Vauxhall  Viceroy, with the Viceroy being a slightly more luxurious version of the Carlton. There was an estate version (dubbed the "Voyage" in Germany) offered in the Opel range from April 1981 until the end of production in 1982, which became a mainstay in the Holden range in Australia and was also available in the Chevrolet range in South Africa. It was never offered by Vauxhall in the UK as a Viceroy, although a one-off estate car was built in 1981 for Queen Elizabeth II, for her to carry her Corgi dogs. The car still survives today, one of only 15 Vauxhall Viceroys left registered in the UK, as of 2006.

The Commodore was dropped by Opel in Europe and was replaced by the Opel Omega, which occupied a higher class than the Rekord, like the Commodore once did. It is this model which the early Holden Commodore models were based on, introduced in late 1978, and eventually replaced (after several facelifts) in 1988, with the VN Commodore, a model based on the then-current Senator and Omega models.

Manufacture elsewhere
It was the Opel Commodore and Vauxhall Viceroy that formed the basis for the first Holden Commodore in Australia, and was sold in South Africa as the Chevrolet Commodore until 1982, when it was rebadged as an Opel. The South African Commodore was introduced in July 1978, at the same time as the Rekord E went on sale there. These originally had Chevrolet engines, pushrod inline-sixes of 3.8 or 4.1 liters. Sold as a standard or a GL (with the 4.1 only available as a sedan with automatic transmission), the South African version replaced the earlier Chevrolet 3800 and 4100, also based on the Commodore.

However, in South Africa, General Motors South Africa (later Delta) offered a revised version of the Commodore until 1986, again combining the bodyshell of the Rekord with the front end of the revised Senator. It was also sold there with the same 3-litre inline-six, producing .

Sources
Werner Oswald, Deutsche Autos 1945–1975. Motorbuch Verlag, Stuttgart 1975. . (For Commodore A)

External links

Opel Commodore history (in Russian) English translation here
Opel Commodore A technical information (in Finnish)
Opel technical specifications at Histomobile
Classic Opel Parts database
Opel Commodore C (in Polish and English soon)

Commodore
Rear-wheel-drive vehicles
Executive cars
Coupés
Sedans
Station wagons
Cars introduced in 1967
1970s cars
1980s cars